Kiss of Life is a 2007 film directed by Nick Zapatina.This film is known for its soundtrack, written and produced by Nick Zapatina (see To Fili Tis Zois (soundtrack)).

Plot
Paschalis (Laertis Malkotsis) is a 30-year-old agronomist, about to marry his beloved Anthoula on the island of Milos. He accidentally embarks on the boat to Sifnos, where he meets Zoi (Catherine Papoutsaki), a beautiful but strange photographer who goes to the island for her own 'purposes'. Things will become even more difficult for Paschalis when a strike of ship captains may cost him his marriage!  But things change when together with Zoi he meets a couple (Zeta Douka & Themos Anastasiadis) in Sifnos, who try to help him come together with his future wife in time for the marriage. But many unexpected situations lead to funny incidents and a lot of things are revealed about the four heroes.

Cast
Cathrine Papoutsaki
Laertis Malkotsis
Zeta Douka
Themos Anastasiadis
John Zouganelis
Sakis Boulas
Cathrine Matziou
Chris Tripodis

Home media
On Friday, 7 of March 2008, it was released on DVD. It contains English subtitles and Greek subtitles for the hearing impaired. It also contains a bonus feature introducing the landscapes and hotels of the island Sifnos, Greece.

Box office
The film made had an estimated number of more than 250,000 cinema ticket sales in its 4th week of release, all in Greek cinemas alone.

See also
To Fili Tis Zois (soundtrack)
To Fili Tis Zois (Elena Paparizou song)

External links
  
 

2007 films
Greek romantic comedy films
2000s Greek-language films